Władysław Findeisen (28 January 1926 – 7 March 2023) was a Polish engineer, academic and politician.

Life and career 
Born in Poznań, the son of two engineers, during the World War II Findeisen took part in the Warsaw Uprising, being captured by Nazis and being imprisoned in a war camp in Germany. In 1949, he gratuated in Electrical Engineering at the Warsaw University of Technology, where he later became professor and where he co-founded the Department of Automatic Control and Telemechanics (later renamed as Institute of Automatic Control), that he headed from 1955 to 1981. He served as rector of the university from 1981 to 1985, when he was dismissed for political reasons.  A member of the Solidarity movement and a supporter of Lech Wałęsa, he was senator from 1989 to 1993.

The main object of Findeisen's studies was the theory and technology of automatic control, and among other things with his team he developed a system of hierarchical steady-state control used in the chemical industry. He authored or co-authored about 80 scientific articles and 6 books.

During his career Findeisen received various honours and accolades, notably the Order of the White Eagle,  the Commander's Cross of the Order of Polonia Restituta, the Warsaw Uprising Cross and the Honorary Citizenship of Warsaw. He died in Warsaw on 7 March 2023, at the age of 97.

References

External links
 
 Władysław Findeisen at Warsaw Rising Museum

1926 births
2023 deaths
Polish engineers
Polish dissidents
Politicians from Poznań
Democratic Union (Poland) politicians
Members of the Senate of Poland 1989–1991
Members of the Senate of Poland 1991–1993
Home Army members
Warsaw Uprising insurgents
Recipients of the Armia Krajowa Cross
Recipients of the Medal of the Commission for National Education
Recipients of the State Award Badge (Poland)
Recipients of the Order of Polonia Restituta (1944–1989)
Recipients of the Order of the White Eagle (Poland)
Warsaw University of Technology alumni
Academic staff of the Warsaw University of Technology